American Football, also known retrospectively as LP1, is the debut studio album by American rock band of the same name, released on September 14, 1999, through Polyvinyl. It was recorded shortly after the band released their debut self-titled EP through Polyvinyl in October 1998. The group, consisting of vocalist/guitarist Mike Kinsella, guitarist Steve Holmes, and drummer Steve Lamos, recorded their debut album at Private Studios in Urbana, Illinois, with production from Brendan Gamble.

American Football was positively received by critics and US college radio stations, but the band split up soon after its release. The album has since received further critical acclaim and attained cult status and is today considered one of the most important math rock and Midwest emo records of the 1990s. A deluxe edition was released by Polyvinyl in May 2014 shortly after American Football announced their reunion, the demand for which crashed the label's website, and peaked at number 68 on the US Billboard 200. A month later, a music video was released for the song "Never Meant", directed by Chris Strong, who created the cover artwork for American Football.

Background
Frontman Mike Kinsella previously played in Chicago-based bands Cap'n Jazz and Joan of Arc alongside his brother Tim. Mike played drums for both bands. In 1997 Kinsella started The One Up Downstairs, whose line-up consisted of Allen Johnson on bass, Steve Lamos on drums, David Johnson on guitar, and Kinsella himself on vocals. The One Up Downstairs recorded three songs that were planned for a 7" vinyl release by Polyvinyl. However, the band broke up before it was pressed, thus the record was shelved. Shortly afterwards, Lamos was jamming with guitarist Steve Holmes, who was Kinsella's college roommate. Kinsella thought he "could add something", resulting in the trio forming American Football. The band got their name from a poster that Lamos' girlfriend had spotted. The poster read, "Come see American Football, the most overpaid athletes in the world."

The first time the group met it was "pretty casual", and their "[musical] ideas were noodly and meandering", according to Kinsella, who "started putting some notes to them." The trio was based in Champaign, Illinois while Kinsella was attending the University of Illinois. American Football was initially a side project, not intending to become a full-time commitment, as Holmes comments, due to them "always half-assing things". The first song the group wrote together was the instrumental "Five Silent Miles". At the time they were listening to Steve Reich, attempting to work out interplay between two guitars. The band released a 3-track self-titled EP in October 1998 which included "Five Silent Miles".

Composition and recording
Kinsella used American Football in an attempt to revive the more rock-oriented sound of Joan of Arc's earlier material. The album is a stripped-back approach to later-day Joan of Arc, resulting in an emocore-sounding album, which also mixed with indie rock and math rock. At the time, Kinsella liked The Cure, The Smiths and "super sad shit." Holmes and Kinsella were also into punk and hardcore music, while Lamos was into jazz. The band concentrated on interaction between the two guitars, basing their timing on musical cues. According to Lamos the song titles were made up a couple of hours "before we finished the artwork." Lamos also mentioned that the band simply referred to the material as "the B song or the C-sharp song." Each song is in a different tuning. Kinsella had a journal that he used lyrics from, though they were written "from years before that, so it was just like, 'Yeah, that’ll work.'." After writing the lyrics and melodies, Kinsella would "just screech...them out." While practicing the material, they didn't have a PA system and thus Holmes and Lamos did not know the lyrics until the group did live performances.

American Football was made "literally in the last four days" before two-thirds of the band had to move back home, according to Kinsella. The album was recorded in May 1999 at Private Studios in Urbana, Illinois on a TASCAM 85 16B analog tape recorder, and was produced by Brendan Gamble. Gamble previously produced the band's self-titled EP. Not all of the material was in a finished state by the time the band went to record and they agreed to simply "finish [writing] these songs in the studio and put out the record." The group didn't have a bass player and decided to thicken the sound by doubling the guitar tracks. In addition to their usual instruments, each member provided further instrumentation: Holmes played the Wurlitzer while Lamos played trumpet, and Kinsella played bass. The album was mastered by Jonathan Pines at Private Studios in July 1999.

Photography
The house on the artwork, located on 704 W. High St in Urbana, Illinois, is within walking distance of the University of Illinois. Photography was done by Chris Strong and was designed by Strong and Suraiya Nathani. None of the band members lived in the house; according to Kinsella,  "it was friends of friends" who lived in the house when they went to college. Joe Goggins, writing for The Line of Best Fit, wrote that "Like all the best cover shots," the photo symbolizes "the music it prefaces in such an intangible, elusive way". Also noting that the album "sounds like it could only have been made in small-town America," and that the cover art "looks as if it could only really have been taken in similar surroundings." The house became a landmark for emo music fans, who often visit the house to take photos. Music journalist Sean Neumann, who documented the history of the house for Vice, noted that fans have carved markings into the sidewalk in front of the home where Strong took the original photograph. The house would later take a leading position in the band's reunion, and the interior of the house later used for the cover of their eponymous second album. Kinsella revealed that the repeated references to the house was due to the fact it was one of the few images related to the band.

Release
American Football was released on Polyvinyl Record Co. on September 14, 1999. According to a contemporary in the CMJ New Music Report,  the album performed well at college radio stations, perhaps due to Kinsella's musical past. Despite its minor success, the band broke up due to the members no longer living in the same city and their college courses coming to an end. Kinsella has since stated that the band knew when they were recording the album that they were going to break up. Kinsella also said that they "never had any ambitious goals. [W]e weren't kids who wanted to...tour all summer." Kinsella and Holmes both moved to Chicago and remained in contact at first. Meanwhile, Lamos moved to Colorado, later becoming a professor. Kinsella wanted to form a new group where he had full creative control, and formed the Owen project, while Holmes and Lamos later played together with The Geese. In 2004 Kinsella recorded an acoustic version of "Never Meant" for a split release between Owen and Rutabega. Also that year, the American Football album was pressed on vinyl for the first time and released on Polyvinyl.

In a 2019 interview with Noisey, Polyvinyl co-founder Matt Lundford described the album's subsequent sales figures and influence in the years following its release as "a constant climb upwards." Lunford recalled that American Football "just kept organically being discovered by people, and then inspiring people and inspiring bands, and then being rediscovered."

Reissue and touring
In April 2014, American Football announced they were reuniting for live performances. Holmes said the group realised that "the time was ripe for three middle aged dudes to play some old songs about teenage feelings, and stand around tuning guitars for a long time." Polyvinyl released a deluxe edition of two discs containing various demos and live tracks with expanded packaging on May 20. Demand for the re-release had crashed Polyvinyl's website. The reissue came about when Holmes found cassette tapes of demos and showed them to Polyvinyl. Polyvinyl, who first teased a possible release back in 2012, asked if the band wanted to do anything with the tapes. The group were initially unaware of the album's anniversary. One of the live recordings was "The 7's"; it was one of the first songs the band ever wrote and was used to close their live performances. The song was "one of the more interesting things" the band ever wrote, according to Holmes and showcases the band's interest in different time signatures.

On June 5, 2014, a music video was released for "Never Meant". Directed by Chris Strong, the video was filmed inside and around the house that features on the album cover artwork. The video was set in Urbana, Illinois, around 1999. Strong revealed that the storyline was "about a brief relationship occurring between two characters at the end of their college experience". Strong had other people portray the band. American Football, with the addition of Kinsella's cousin Nate playing bass, played a surprise show in August in Chicago. They then followed this up with playing a festival in September and three nights at New York's Webster Hall. Further dates running into December were also played. In December, a live video was released for "Never Meant", filmed in October at New York's Webster Hall. The band played their first ever UK shows in May 2015.

Reception

American Football, with the help of word-of-mouth, gained cult status since its release. AllMusic reviewer Fred Thomas stated that "Every song here manages to sound meticulously constructed without diminishing the easy, often dreamlike feel of the album. The record is defined by a sense of possibility and youthful discovery, and stands out not just as an anomalistic emo-jazz hybrid but as a lasting, iconic statement in the often blurry history of independent music".

Stereogum listed "Never Meant" as one of "30 Essential Songs From The Golden Era Of Emo" and "The Summer Ends" as one of "30 Essential Post-Rock Songs". NME listed the album as one of "20 Emo Albums That Have Resolutely Stood The Test Of Time". Rolling Stone ranked the album at No. 6 on their list of the 40 Greatest Emo Albums of All Time. "Never Meant" appeared on a best-of emo songs list by Vulture.

The reissue charted at number 68 on the Billboard 200 chart, number 5 on the Catalog Albums chart and number 22 on the Tastemaker Albums chart. The reissue was ranked at number 1 on Paste magazine's "Five Recent Reissues Worth Owning" list.

Track listing
All songs written and composed by American Football.

Bonus disc

Personnel 
Adapted from the liner notes.
American Football
 Steve Holmes – guitars, keyboards (3), Wurlitzer (9)
 Steve Lamos – drums, tambourine (1, 6), shaker (2), trumpet (2, 4, 9), bass guitar (7)
 Mike Kinsella – vocals (1-4, 6-8), guitars (1-6,  8, 9), acoustic guitar (6), bass guitar (4, 7)

Production
 Brendan Gamble – recording
 Chris Strong – photography
 Chris Strong, Suraiya Nathani – design

Chart positions

References 
 Footnotes

 Citations

Sources

External links

American Football at MySpace (streamed copy where licensed)

1999 debut albums
American Football (band) albums
Polyvinyl Record Co. albums